Michael H. Gottesman is a lawyer and law professor at Georgetown University Law Center, specializing in the fields of labor law, constitutional law, and civil rights.  He  practiced and became a partner with the Washington, D.C., firm Bredhoff and Kaiser from 1961-1988.

After attending the University of Chicago in Chicago, Illinois and Yale Law School in New Haven, Connecticut, Gottesman worked as a Trial Attorney in the U.S. Department of Justice Antitrust Division.  He has served as a member of the Judicial Nominating Commission for the District of Columbia; the Executive Board of the Lawyers' Committee for Civil Rights Under Law and its Amicus subcommittee; and the Legal Committee of the American Association of University Professors.  He has argued 20 cases in front of the Supreme Court of the United States.

References
Georgetown University Law Center faculty biography, with link to recent articles

Georgetown University Law Center faculty
Year of birth missing (living people)
Living people
American civil rights lawyers
Yale Law School alumni
University of Chicago alumni